Rob G (born December 4, 1973) is an American comics artist who has done work for DC Comics, Image Comics, and AiT/Planet Lar, and is best known for Teenagers from Mars and The Couriers.

Biography
Rob G. studied art at Virginia Commonwealth University in Richmond, Virginia, until late 1997 when he moved to New York City and began self-publishing Teenagers from Mars with Rick Spears after self-publishing their second graphic novel Dead West, the pair published the comic series Repo with Image Comics.

He lives in Portland, Oregon, with his wife and daughter.

Bibliography
Comics work includes:

Teenagers from Mars (with Rick Spears, 8-issue limited series, self-published, 2001–2003, tpb, 272 pages, Gigantic Graphic Novels, February 2005)
The Couriers (with Brian Wood, graphic novel series, AiT/Planet Lar):
 The Couriers (88 pages, March 2003)
 Dirtbike Manifesto (88 pages, February 2004)
 The Ballad of Johnny Funwrecker (88 pages, February 2005)
Detective Comics 785-788 (with Rick Spears, DC Comics, October 2003 - January 2004)
 "Call To Arms: The Ballad of Archibald Copperpot: Act 3 - Scene 5" (with Rick Spears, in Metal Hurlant magazine #12, Humanoids Publishing, June/July 2004)
Dead West (with Rick Spears, graphic novel, 144 pages, Gigantic Graphic Novels, August 2005)
Filler (with Rick Spears, graphic novel, 96 pages, AiT/Planet Lar, April 2005)
 "The State I Am In" (with Rick Spears, in Put the Book Back on the Shelf: A Belle and Sebastian Anthology, anthology graphic novel, Image Comics, March 2006)
Repo (with Rick Spears, 5-issue limited series, Image Comics, June–December 2007, tpb, 152 pages, March 2008)
 "Operation Torch" (with Rick Spears, in Postcards: True Stories That Never Happened, anthology hardcover graphic novel, 160 pages, Villard Books, July 2007)

Notes

References

External links

Rob G. at ComicSpace
Gigantic Graphic Novels
The Warden, webcomic

Virginia Commonwealth University alumni
People from Newport News, Virginia
Artists from Virginia
Living people
1973 births